Elementary is the seventh album from contemporary Christian music singer Cindy Morgan.

Track listing

All songs written by Cindy Morgan, except where noted.
 "The World Needs Your Love" – 3:23
 "Good Thing" (Alex Alzamora, Morgan) – 2:51
 "Elementary" – 2:48
 "Love Can" – 4:22
 "New World" (Morgan, Andrew Ramsey) – 3:31
 "Believe" (Brent Bourgeois, Morgan) – 3:25
 "End of the World" (Morgan, Pat McDonald, Tony Nicholas) – 3:12
 "Walk in the Rain" (Bobby Bluebell, Morgan) – 2:36
 "Grape Soda" (spoken intro) – 0:19
 "Sunshine" – 3:43
 "Happy" (Brian Lenthall, Morgan) – 3:06
 "Love is Waiting" – 4:04
 "In These Rooms" – 5:55
 "I Love You" – 3:43

Track information and credits taken from the album's liner notes.

Personnel
 Cindy Morgan – lead vocals, backing vocals, acoustic piano, electric piano
 Brent Bourgeois – keyboards, acoustic piano, backing vocals
 Jeff Roach – keyboards, acoustic piano, programming, backing vocals
 Mark Douthit – keyboards, flute, alto saxophone, tenor saxophone, horn arrangements
 Tim Lauer – accordion, harmonica, melodica
 Alex Alzamora – programming
 Pete Kipley – programming
 Andrew Ramsey – electric guitar, acoustic guitar 
 Chris Rodriguez – electric guitar, backing vocals 
 Larry Tagg – bass guitar 
 Craig Nelson – upright bass
 Raymond Boyd – drums
 Jim White – drums, percussion, percussion programming, loops
 Eric Darken – percussion 
 Denis Solee – clarinet
 Mike Haynes – trumpet, horn arrangements
 George Tidwell – trumpet
 Tom Howard – string arrangements and conductor 
 David Davidson – violin
 Gene Miller – backing vocals
 Matt Hammon – choir vocals
 Jeremy Jensen – choir vocals
 Sherman Lewis – choir vocals
 David Rice – choir vocals
 Steve Smith – choir vocals

Production
 Producers – Brent Bourgeois and Cindy Morgan
 A&R Direction – Brent Bourgeois
 A&R Coordinator – Linda Bourne Wornell
 Engineers – Cory Fite and David Schober
 Assistant Engineer – J.C. Monterrosa
 Mixing – David Schober
 Mastered by Ken Love at MasterMix (Nashville, TN).
 Art Direction – Chuck Nelson 
 Design – Jeff Jones

References

External links
Cindy Morgan Official Site
Word Records Official Site

2001 albums
Cindy Morgan (singer) albums